The Arkansas–Missouri League was a Class D level league in Minor League Baseball that operated from 1936 to 1940. The league was previously known as the Arkansas State League.

Cities represented
 Bentonville, Arkansas: Bentonville Mustangs 1936
 Carthage, Missouri:  Carthage Pirates 1938–1940
 Cassville, Missouri:  Cassville Blues 1936
 Fayetteville, Arkansas: Fayetteville Bears 1936; Fayetteville Angels 1937–1940
 Monett, Missouri:  Monett Red Birds 1936–1939
 Neosho, Missouri:  Neosho Night Hawks 1937; Neosho Yankees 1938–1940
 Rogers, Arkansas:  Rogers Lions 1936–1937; Rogers Reds 1938
 Siloam Springs, Arkansas:  Siloam Springs Travelers 1936–1938; Siloam Springs Cardinals 1940

Standings & statistics 
1936 Arkansas–Missouri League

Playoff: Siloam Springs 4 games, Cassville 3. One tie

 
1937 Arkansas–Missouri League

Vinita the sixth franchise, withdrew May 5, before the season started. Season played with five teams.Playoff: Fayetteville 3 games, Siloam Springs 0. Rogers 3 games, Neosho 1.Finals: Rogers 4 games, Fayetteville 1.

1938 Arkansas–Missouri League
schedule

Playoff: Neosho 3 games, Rogers 0. Carthage 3 games, Fayetteville 2.Finals: Carthage 4 games, Neosho 1.

1939 Arkansas–Missouri League

Playoff Final: Carthage 4 games, Fayetteville 1.

 
1940 Arkansas-Missouri League
schedule

The league disbanded July 1.

Sources
The Encyclopedia of Minor League Baseball, Second Edition

References

External links
Baseball Reference

Defunct minor baseball leagues in the United States
Baseball leagues in Missouri
Baseball leagues in Arkansas
Sports leagues established in 1936
Sports leagues disestablished in 1940